The 1976 Syracuse Orangemen football team represented Syracuse University during the 1976 NCAA Division I football season. The team was led by third-year head coach Frank Maloney and played their home games at Archbold Stadium in Syracuse, New York. The team finished with a record of 3–8.

Schedule

References

Syracuse
Syracuse Orange football seasons
Syracuse Orangemen football